"Can't Stop" is a song performed by After 7, issued as the fourth single from the group's eponymous debut album. It is the group's highest-charting single, peaking at #6 on the Billboard Hot 100 in 1990. The song also became the group's second #1 R&B single, as well as peaking at #25 on the dance charts.

"Can't Stop" was certified Gold by the RIAA on February 7, 1991.

Chart positions

Weekly charts

Year-end charts

See also
 List of number-one R&B singles of 1990 (U.S.)

References

1989 songs
1990 singles
After 7 songs
Song recordings produced by Babyface (musician)
Songs written by Babyface (musician)
Songs written by L.A. Reid
Virgin Records singles